Ceroxylon peruvianum is a species of palm tree. It is endemic to Peru.

References

peruvianum
Trees of Peru